Illegal operation may refer to:

Medicine
 Illegal operation (euphemism), an archaic term for abortion
 Abortion, a medical intervention to terminate a human pregnancy
 Organ theft

Computing
 Illegal opcode
 General protection fault

Other
 Illegal taxi operation
 Criminal organization
 Criminal conspiracy

See also

 Operation (disambiguation)